NDPR can stand for:

Prairie Public, a public radio and television broadcaster in North Dakota
National Sovereignty Party of Russia, a Russian nationalist party